Lisa Miskovsky (born 9 March 1975) is a Swedish musician and singer-songwriter.

Career
Miskovsky placed herself on the Swedish rock music charts with her debut album Lisa Miskovsky and single "Driving One of Your Cars", with Swedish releases in 2001. Following this release, she received two Swedish Rock Bear awards; one for Best Swedish Newcomer, and the other for Best Swedish Female Artist of the Year. She followed up with the album Fallingwater, released in 2003, which climbed to number one in the Swedish pop charts, reaching platinum sales. The album contained two hit songs, "Lady Stardust" and "Sing to Me". "Lady Stardust" was also a radio hit in Europe, particularly in Germany and the United Kingdom.

Some of her music was co-written and produced by Joakim Berg, lead songwriter from the Swedish rock band Kent, and Simon Nordberg.

Miskovsky is a songwriter as well as a singer and musician. She had the original idea and wrote the lyrics to "Shape of My Heart", performed by Backstreet Boys.

Miskovsky contributed vocals to the track "Dead End" on Come Clarity, the 2006 release from Swedish melodic death metal outfit In Flames.

Miskovsky performed the theme song "Still Alive" for Mirror's Edge, an action-adventure video game developed by EA Digital Illusions CE (DICE). A remix album titled Still Alive: The Remixes was released on 11 November 2008 to coincide with the North American release date of Mirror's Edge. The album featured Miskovsky's original version, along with remixes by Benny Benassi, Junkie XL, Paul van Dyk, Armand van Helden, and Teddybears.

In 2011 she released her fourth studio album, Violent Sky, after moving record labels from Universal Music to Sony Music Entertainment.

Miskovsky entered Melodifestivalen 2012, the Swedish preselection for the Eurovision Song Contest 2012 with the song "Why Start a Fire". Lisa competed in the fourth semifinal and placed in the top two songs of the heat. Lisa competed at the final in Stockholm in 2012, where she finished 9th.

Ten years after her last entry into the contest, Miskovsky entered Melodifestivalen 2022 with the song "Best to Come". She performed on 19 February 2022 and finished third, qualifying to the semi-final. She performed again at second semi-final on 5 March 2022, finishing third and failing to qualify to the final.

Personal life
Besides music, Miskovsky enjoys snowboarding and has participated in the Swedish national snowboard team.

Her mother, Pirjo, is Finnish and her father, Karel Miškovský, is a Czech immigrant. Her sister is Carolina Miskovsky; the two have performed together publicly.

She shared in a fan interview at Melodifestivalen 2012, that she is a mother with two daughters, however she did not reveal any other personal information. In 2003, she married a Norwegian snowboarder, Marius Sommer. They filed for divorce in 2006 but reconciled for a time. They separated in September 2014. She resides in Umeå.

During the 2014 Winter Olympics she was a sports reporter on location, mainly covering snowboard and freestyle skiing.

Discography

Studio albums

Compilation albums

Singles

Other
2005: Kent - Max 500 (vocals on "Välgärningar & Illdåd")
2006: In Flames - Come Clarity (vocals on "Dead End")
2008: Still Alive (theme for the video game Mirror's Edge) #8 UK Indie chart #96 UK chart #23 Billboard Hot Dance Club Play
2013: Comfort You (lyrics) & Home (featuring Marion Raven) (vocals & lyrics), both songs for Raven's latest album Songs from a Blackbird #3 in Norway.

References

External links

 
Official website
MySpace
Mirror's Edge soundtrack website (archived)
Lisa Miskovsky record collection

1975 births
Living people
Swedish guitarists
Swedish pop singers
Swedish rock singers
Swedish women singer-songwriters
Swedish singer-songwriters
English-language singers from Sweden
Swedish people of Czech descent
Swedish people of Finnish descent
People from Umeå
21st-century Swedish singers
21st-century Swedish women singers
21st-century guitarists
21st-century women guitarists
Melodifestivalen contestants of 2022
Melodifestivalen contestants of 2012